Sonata a la Española is a sonata for solo guitar composed in 1969 by the Spanish composer Joaquín Rodrigo.

The piece has three movements.  The first of these, allegro assai, introduces a steady tread against music with a nasal-like sound.  The second, adagio, has a theme centered on the lower strings of the guitar.  The final, allegro moderato, is a  bolero mixed with the Spanish music.

Movements
1. Allegro assai
2. Adagio
3. Tempo de bolero

See also
Fantasía para un gentilhombre
Concierto de Aranjuez

Compositions by Joaquín Rodrigo
Guitar sonatas
1969 compositions